The Premio Ribot is a Group 2 flat horse race in Italy open to thoroughbreds aged three years or older. It is run at Capannelle over a distance 1,600 metres (about 1 mile), and it is scheduled to take place each year in late October or early November.

The event is named after Ribot, a successful Italian-trained racehorse in the mid-1950s. It was given Group 2 status in the 1970s.

The Premio Ribot was usually held on the first or second Sunday in November and staged on the same day as the Premio Roma. Since 2015 it has been held a week earlier than usual, at the same meeting as the Premio Lydia Tesio.

Records
Most successful horse:
 no horse has won this race more than once since 1976

Leading jockey since 1982 (3 wins):
 Frankie Dettori – Taxi de Nuit (1996), Oriental Fashion (1999), Altieri (2002)
 Dario Vargiu - Duca d'Atri (2003), Porsenna (2014), Greg Pass (2016)

Leading trainer since 1982 (3 wins):
 Vittorio Caruso – Misil (1991), Altieri (2002), Worthadd (2010)

Winners since 1982

 Mirror Black finished first in 1989, but he was relegated to third place following a stewards' inquiry.

Earlier winners
 1976: Ovac
 1977: Isabella Moretti
 1978: Capo Bon

 1979: Costly Wave
 1980: Peloponnes
 1981: Vargas Llosa

See also
 List of Italian flat horse races

References
 Racing Post:
 capannelleippodromo.it – Albo d'Oro – Premio Ribot.
 galopp-sieger.de – Premio Ribot.
 horseracingintfed.com – International Federation of Horseracing Authorities – Premio Ribot (2016).
 pedigreequery.com – Premio Ribot – Roma Capannelle.

Horse races in Italy
Open mile category horse races
Sports competitions in Rome